Lorenzo Marsaglia (born 16 November 1996 in Rome) is an Italian diver.

Marsaglia is an athlete of the Gruppo Sportivo della Marina Militare,

Biography
He won the bronze medal at 1m springboard during 2019 European Diving Championships in Kiev.

References

Living people
1996 births
Italian male divers
Divers from Rome
Divers of Marina Militare
Divers at the 2020 Summer Olympics
Olympic divers of Italy
21st-century Italian people
20th-century Italian people